The 1991 Basque foral elections were held on Sunday, 26 May 1991, to elect the 4th Juntas Generales of Álava, Biscay and Gipuzkoa. All 153 seats in the three Juntas Generales were up for election. The elections were held simultaneously with regional elections in thirteen autonomous communities and local elections all throughout Spain.

Overall

Foral deputation control
The following table lists party control in the foral deputations. Gains for a party are displayed with the cell's background shaded in that party's colour.

Historical territories

Álava

Biscay

Gipuzkoa

References

Basque
1991